Ganbare (がんばれ, Hang in there!), a form of the Japanese verb ganbaru, may refer to:

 Ganbare! Gian!!, a short Doraemon film
 Ganbare!! Robocon, a Japanese television program
 Ganbare!! Tabuchi-kun!!, a yonkoma manga series
 Ganbare 35, a Canadian racing sailboat design

See also
 Ganbareh, a 2002 song by Sash!